Pexacerfont (INN, previously known as BMS-562,086) is a drug developed by Bristol-Myers Squibb which acts as a CRF1 antagonist.

Corticotropin-releasing factor (CRF), also known as corticotropin-releasing hormone, is an endogenous peptide hormone which is released in response to various triggers such as chronic stress. This then triggers the release of corticotropin (ACTH), another hormone which is involved in the physiological response to stress. Chronic release of CRF and ACTH is believed to be directly or indirectly involved in many of the harmful physiological effects of chronic stress, such as excessive glucocorticoid release, diabetes mellitus, osteoporosis, stomach ulcers, anxiety, depression, and development of high blood pressure and consequent cardiovascular problems.

Pexacerfont is a recently developed CRF-1 antagonist which was in clinical trials for the treatment of anxiety disorders, and has also been proposed to be useful for the treatment of depression and irritable bowel syndrome.

A recent multicenter, randomized, double-blind, placebo-controlled trial found that pexacerfont (100 mg/day) did not separate from placebo on the primary outcome measure (the mean change from baseline to end point in the Hamilton Anxiety Scale score). These results suggest that blockade of CRF1 receptor may not be a feasible treatment for anxiety disorders in certain human populations.

See also 
 Corticotropin releasing hormone antagonists
 Antalarmin
 CP-154,526
 Emicerfont
 Verucerfont

References 

Anxiolytics
Corticotropin-releasing hormone antagonists
Bristol Myers Squibb
Pyridines
Phenol ethers